The 1962–63 FAW Welsh Cup is the 76th season of the annual knockout tournament for competitive football teams in Wales.

Key
League name pointed after clubs name.
CCL - Cheshire County League
FL D2 - Football League Second Division
FL D3 - Football League Third Division
FL D4 - Football League Fourth Division
SFL - Southern Football League
WLN - Welsh League North

Fifth round
Ten winners from the Fourth round and six new clubs.

Sixth round

Semifinal
Borough United and Hereford United played at Wrexham, Newport County and Swansea Town played at Cardiff.

Final

External links
The FAW Welsh Cup

1962-63
Wales
Cup